Paul Nkata is a former Ugandan international footballer now serving as the coach at Kenyan second-tier side Muhoroni Youth F.C.

Career
As a player he turned out for Ugandan clubs Nsambya FC, Bunamwaya S.C., Express FC, and SC Villa.

He formerly coached Ugandan sides Misindye FC, SC Villa, Express FC, Uganda Revenue Authority SC. Uganda U-20, and Kenyan sides Nairobi City Stars, Tusker F.C., Bandari F.C. (Kenya), and Kakamega Homeboyz F.C.

Before heading to Muhoroni Youth F.C. he had been appointed coach by Gor Mahia F.C. only for it to be revoked days later.

References

1960 births 
Living people
Expatriate football managers in Kenya
Football managers in Kenya
Ugandan football managers